Colorado, a state in the western United States that straddles the heights of the Rocky Mountains and the western edges of the Great Plains, has been the traditional home of several Uto-Aztecan, Algonquian, and Tanoan tribes. However, all tribes except for bands of the Ute were relocated to other states, primarily Wyoming and Oklahoma, during the Westward Expansion of the late nineteenth and early twentieth centuries. As such, in total, there is only one remaining Native American language spoken in Colorado: Colorado River Numic.

Distribution
There is only one Native American language currently spoken in Colorado. Population estimates are based on figures from Ethnologue and U.S. Census data, as given in sub-pages below. The language is shown in the table below:

See also
 Native Americans in the United States
 Indigenous languages of the Americas
 Uto-Aztecan languages

References

Native American history of Colorado
Colorado
Native Americans in Colorado